Bahadurgarh is a tehsil of Jhajjar district in Haryana, India.
It was a part of Rohtak district till 1997 when Jhajjar district was carved out of Rohtak district. Bahadurgarh serves as the tehsil headquarters.

List of villages

Bahadurgarh
 Mandothi
Nuna majra
Sankhol
Rohad
Balour
Barktabad
Kheri Jasour
Dahkora
Jasour Kheri
Nilothi
Ladrawan
Kulasi
Kanonda
Shadpur
Parnala
Barahi
Asoudha Siwan
Asoudha Todran
Bhaproda
Kharhar
Chhara
Silothi
Kharman
Chhudani
Asanda
Mehandipur
Tandaheri
Kherka Musulman
Lowa khurd
Kasar
Lowa Kalan
Shidipur
Isharheri
Soldha
Loharheri
Khairpur
Bamnauli
Hassanpur
Jakhoda
Majra Asanda
Mattan
Rewari Khera
Mukandpur
Agarpur
Sarai Aurangabad

References

Haryana
Jhajjar district
Rohtak